Kyuss / Queens of the Stone Age is a split EP by American rock bands Kyuss and Queens of the Stone Age, released in December 1997 on Man's Ruin Records. It features some of the final studio recordings by Kyuss while debuting former Kyuss guitarist Josh Homme's next project, Queens of the Stone Age.

Overview
Five of the EP's six tracks were previously released. Kyuss' cover version of the Black Sabbath song "Into the Void" had been released as a single by Man's Ruin in 1996 after the band had already broken up, with "Fatso Forgotso" as its B-side. "Fatso Forgotso Phase II" had been released under the title "Flip the Phase" in 1995 as the B-side of the "One Inch Man" single. "Fatso Forgotso" and "Fatso Forgotso Phase II (Flip the Phase)" were later included on the compilation album Muchas Gracias: The Best of Kyuss, released in 2000.

The Queens of the Stone Age tracks "If Only Everything" and "Born to Hula" had been released by Man's Ruin in 1996 on the Gamma Ray 7". Homme initially chose the name Gamma Ray for this new band but received a cease and desist order from a German band who were already using the name. The band name was subsequently changed to Queens of the Stone Age, a nickname given to Kyuss years earlier by their producer, Chris Goss. An alternate recording of "If Only Everything" was included on Queens of the Stone Age's debut album in 1998 under the shortened title "If Only", while an alternate recording of "Born to Hula" appeared as the B-side of "The Lost Art of Keeping a Secret" single from the band's 2000 album Rated R. "Spiders and Vinegaroons" would later be included on the 2011 re-release of Queens of the Stone Age's debut album.

Track listing

Personnel
Credits adapted from the EP's liner notes.

Kyuss
John Garcia – vocals
Josh Homme – guitar
Scott Reeder – bass guitar
Alfredo Hernández – drums

Queens of the Stone Age
Josh Homme – vocals (tracks 4 and 5), bass guitar (track 5), guitar (track 6)
Van Conner – bass guitar (track 4)
Vic "The Stick" Indrizzo – drums
John Garcia – backing vocals (track 5)
Chris Goss – "other stuff" (track 6)

Production
Billy Bizeau – recording engineer (track 1)
Fred Drake – recording engineer (tracks 1–3), mixing engineer (track 1)
Josh Homme – mixing engineer (tracks 2–6), producer (tracks 4–6)
Patrick "Hutch" Hutchinson – mixing engineer (tracks 2 and 3)
Chris Goss – producer (tracks 4–6)
Floyd – recording engineer (tracks 4–6)
Jay – recording engineer (tracks 4–6)

References

Kyuss albums
Queens of the Stone Age albums
1997 EPs
Split EPs
Man's Ruin Records EPs